The Upper Palatine-Bavarian Forest, (no. D63 or 40) is a natural region in Germany in the northeast of Bavaria. It mainly comprises the low mountain ranges of the Bavarian Forest and Upper Palatine Forest which are up to 1456 m high and border on the Bohemian Massif immediately inside the Czech Republic's southwestern border with Germany.

Division into geographical units 

40 (=D63) Upper Palatine-Bavarian Forest
400 Upper Palatine Forest - East
401 Upper Palatine Forest - West
402 Cham-Furth Depression 
403 Bavarian Forest - North
404 Regen Depression 
405 Bavarian Forest - South
406 Falkensteiner Vorwald
407 Lallinger Winkel 
408 Passau Abteiland and Neuburg Forest 
409 Wegscheid Plateau

Neighbouring main unit groups are:
 39 (= D48) Thuringian-Franconian Highlands
 08 (= D61) Franconian Jura
 07 (= D62) Upper Palatine-Upper Main Hills
 06 Lower Bavarian Hills (part of D65)

Literature 
 Meynen, Emil (ed.) Handbuch der naturräumlichen Gliederung Deutschlands. Selbstverlag der Bundesanstalt für Landeskunde, Remagen 1953-1962 (Teil 1, enthält Lieferung 1-5), ISBN B0000BJ19E
 Meynen, Emil (ed.) Handbuch der naturräumlichen Gliederung Deutschlands. Selbstverlag der Bundesanstalt für Landeskunde, Remagen 1959-1962 (Teil 2, enthält Lieferung 6-9), ISBN B0000BJ19F

External links 
BfN natural region fact files:
Main highland backbone
Upper Palatine Forest - East
Bavarian Forest - North
Wegscheid Plateau
Foothills and lowlands
Upper Palatine Forest - West
Cham-Furth Depression
Regen Valley between Roding and Regensburg
Lower Falkenstein Forest
Regensburg Forest, Forstmühle and Waxenberg Forests
Regen Depression
Bavarian Forest - South
Lallinger Winkel
Passau Abteiland - North
Passau Abteiland - South

Forests and woodlands of Bavaria
Natural regions of the Central Uplands